Leonardo Nicolás Povea Pérez (born 26 January 1994) is a Chilean footballer that currently plays for Deportes Copiapó as a midfielder.

Career
A product of Huachipato youth system, Povea has also played for Universidad de Concepción, Deportes Antofagasta, Deportes Iquique and Deportes Copiapó.

Honours

Player
Huachipato
 Primera División de Chile (1): 2012 Clausura

References

External links
 
 

1994 births
Living people
People from Los Ángeles, Chile
Chilean footballers
C.D. Huachipato footballers
Universidad de Concepción footballers
C.D. Antofagasta footballers
Deportes Iquique footballers
Deportes Copiapó footballers
Chilean Primera División players
Primera B de Chile players
Association football midfielders